M88, M-88 or M/88 may refer to:

 M-88 (Michigan highway), a state highway in Michigan
 M/88, a rifle cartridge, adopted by Germany in 1888
 M88 Recovery Vehicle, a US tank recovery vehicle
 BMW M88, an inline 6-cylinder piston engine
 Messier 88, a spiral galaxy in the constellation Coma Berenices
 Snecma M88, an afterburning turbofan engine developed for the Dassault Rafale fighter
 Tumansky M-88, an air-cooled radial aircraft engine
 Zastava M88, a semi-automatic handgun produced by Zastava Arms, Serbia
 A standard firecracker with extra packing, designed to resemble an M-80 explosive
 M-88 Long Range Sniper Rifle, a sniper rifle adopted by the US Navy
 M88, now KLYT, a noncommercial Christian radio station in New Mexico